Mono Pond State Park Reserve is a public recreation area covering  in the town of Columbia, Connecticut,  southwest of Willimantic. The park offers fishing, hiking, picnicking, cross-country skiing, bow hunting, and a boat launch for motorized (8-hp limit) and non-motorized boating. The park is managed by the Connecticut Department of Energy and Environmental Protection and was added to the roll of Connecticut state parks in 2008.

References

External links
 Mono Pond State Park Reserve Connecticut Department of Energy and Environmental Protection

State parks of Connecticut
Parks in Tolland County, Connecticut
Columbia, Connecticut
Protected areas established in 2008
2008 establishments in Connecticut